The vice president of the Republic of Nicaragua is the second highest political position in Nicaragua. According to the current Constitution, the vice president is elected on the same ticket, and at the same time, as the president. The salary of the vice president has been US$3,100 per month.

Deputy Chief of State 1826–1838
As in other countries of Central American Federation, also Nicaragua had Head of State and Deputy Head of State. Deputy Head of State was first mentioned in the Constitution of 1826. The position had a great influence in important decision-making process of the Head of State. The position of Deputy Chief of State was removed in the Constitution of 1838. In case of vacancy in the presidency, a member of Senate would be elected to fill the vacancy.

Vice President of Nicaragua

The position of Vice President of the Republic has existed legally on four occasions:
 During Liberal Constitution between 1893 and 1896. President Zelaya abolished the position in 1896, replacing it with a system of three Presidential Designates elected annually by the National Congress of Nicaragua. 
 During Conservative Constitution from 1911 to 1939.
 From 1962 to 1972 by constitutional reforms of Luis Somoza Debayle in 1962 and René Schick in 1966. 
 After the new Constitution of 1987.

Gen. Anastasio Ortiz, was the first vice president appointed by a Constituent Assembly. The Constitutional system of replacement of the president by the vice president worked in 1923 when President Diego Manuel Chamorro was replaced by Bartolomé Martínez.

A list of the office holders follows.

See also
 List of current vice presidents

References

External links
 Vicepresidency 

Government of Nicaragua
Nicaragua